Israel competed at the 2016 European Athletics Championships in Amsterdam, Netherlands, between 6 and 10 July 2016.

Medals

Results

Men

Track & road events

Field Events

Women

Track & road events

Field Events

Key
Q = Qualified for the next round
q = Qualified for the next round as a fastest loser or, in field events, by position without achieving the qualifying target
N/A = Round not applicable for the event
Bye = Athlete not required to compete in round

References

European Athletics Championships
2016
Nations at the 2016 European Athletics Championships